The 1891-92 season was Sunderland's 12th season in existence, and their second season as a Football League club.

Sunderland overcame a sluggish start (losing the first three away games consecutively) and went on to win all but two games for the rest of the season; including a back-to-back thirteen game winning sequence. They finished the season as English Champions for the first time, marking the first title of the 'Team of All Talents' era; the most successful in the club's history. The team scored a total of 93 league goals in 26 games - an average of 3.6 goals per game. They put seven goals past Derby and put seven past Darwen in both home and away games. Forward John Campbell ended the season as the league's top scorer, scoring a total of 37 goals in just 29 games. The season was unusual in the fact that Sunderland didn't draw a single league match.

Sunderland reached the FA Cup Semi-final for the second year in a row, losing to Aston Villa.

The season saw a number of changes introduced to the sport, with Sunderland's first penalty kick awarded in a game against Bolton and goal nets introduced for the first time.

First team squad

Players Out

Competitions

Football League

League table

Matches

FA Cup

Matches

Squad Statistics

|}

References

 All the Lads: A Complete Who's Who of Sunderland A.F.C., Dykes, Gareth & Lamming, Douglas, Polar Print Group Ltd, 1999
 Sunderland AFC: The Official History 1879-2000, Days, Paul, Business Education Publishers Ltd, 1999
 The StatCat, www.thestatcat.co.uk, last accessed: 2018-11-02

Sunderland A.F.C. seasons
Sunderland
English football championship-winning seasons